Magnus is a given name and surname.

Magnus may also refer to:

Arts and entertainment
 Magnus (2016 film), a documentary film about world chess champion Magnus Carlsen
 Magnús (film), a 1989 Icelandic film by Þráinn Bertelsson
 Magnus (novel), a fictional account of the life of Magnus Erlendsson by George Mackay Brown
 Magnus, a novel by Sylvie Germain
 Magnus (band), a Belgian band
 Magnus (album), an album by Audiomachine

Other uses
 Daewoo Magnus, automobile
 Magnus (computer algebra system)
 Magnus Harmonica Corporation, manufacturer of harmonicas and reed organs

See also
 Magnus effect, in physics
 Magna (disambiguation)
 Magnes (disambiguation)
 Magnum (disambiguation)
 Manus (disambiguation)